Tchatkalophantes is a genus of sheet weavers that was first described by A. V. Tanasevitch in 2001.

Species
 it contains ten species, found in Asia:
Tchatkalophantes baltistan Tanasevitch, 2011 – Pakistan
Tchatkalophantes bonneti (Schenkel, 1963) – China
Tchatkalophantes huangyuanensis (Zhu & Li, 1983) – China
Tchatkalophantes hyperauritus (Loksa, 1965) – Mongolia
Tchatkalophantes karatau Tanasevitch, 2001 – Kazakhstan
Tchatkalophantes kungei Tanasevitch, 2001 – Kyrgyzstan
Tchatkalophantes mongolicus Tanasevitch, 2001 – Mongolia
Tchatkalophantes rupeus (Tanasevitch, 1986) – Kazakhstan
Tchatkalophantes tarabaevi Tanasevitch, 2001 – Kazakhstan
Tchatkalophantes tchatkalensis (Tanasevitch, 1983) (type) – Central Asia

See also
 List of Linyphiidae species (Q–Z)

References

Araneomorphae genera
Linyphiidae
Spiders of Asia